Judy Ho (commonly known as Dr. Judy Ho or Dr. Judy), is a triple board-certified and licensed clinical and forensic neuropsychologist, media personality, motivational speaker, clinical researcher, and published author, born in Taipei, Taiwan with dual U.S. citizenship.

Ho appears on national television and radio broadcasts as a psychology expert, panelist, narrator and host. She co-hosted Season 12 of The Doctors, preceded by hosting the CBS syndicated talk show Face The Truth (2018) alongside Vivica Fox, being a recurring panelist (over 200 episodes) on The Dr. Drew Show (2013-2016).

She currently hosts the Podcast SuperCharged Life with Dr. Judy,

Dr. Judy maintains a private practice based in Los Angeles, CA, while working as a tenured associate professor of psychology at Pepperdine University Graduate School of Education and Psychology (since 2010).

Early life
Born in Taipei, Taiwan Ho is fluent in Mandarin.

Education and accreditation

Licensed by the California Board of Psychology in 2009, and having received her board-certification by the American Board of Professional Psychology in 2011, Ho became double-board certified through the National Board of Forensic Evaluators in 2015, upon earning her diplomate as a Board Certified Forensic Mental Health Evaluator (CFMHE).

Career

Ho is the founder and executive director of the STAGES Project, a not-for-profit prevention program for at-risk youth, which utilizes arts and music as a therapeutic intervention for at-risk students. In 2016, Ho created and implemented PEP4SAFE, a scientifically driven, no-cost psychoeducational program for parents and teachers in various school districts of Los Angeles, CA, for which she acts as the Principal Investigator.

Consulting work
Ho has served as a forensic and/or neuropsychological consultant for multiple national organizations and treatment centers, including the National Institute of Mental Health's Community Partners in Care Project (2008-2011), Centers for Disease Control's Legacy Project (2011-2015), the Los Angeles County Department of Mental Health (2011–present), Kaiser Permanente (2013–present), Promises Treatment Center (2013-2017), Bridges to Recovery (2011–2020), Clearview Treatment Centers (2012–2019), Pure Recovery California (2016–2018), Milestones Ranch Malibu (2017–present), and the Center for Professional Recovery (2017–2018).

She serves on many board of directors, including board chair on the ABPP Examination Committee (2016–present), Treasurer and Board of Directors of the American Academy of Pediatric Neuropsychology, Board of Directors of Girl Scouts of Greater Los Angeles, and Chair of the Pepperdine University  Graduate and Professional Schools Institutional Review Board (IRB).

Author
On August 20, 2019, Ho's first book Stop Self-Sabotage: Six Steps to Unlock Your True Motivation, Harness Your Willpower, and Get Out of Your Own Way was published by HarperCollins.

Ho has regularly written and contributed to various print and online publications, offering psychological analysis, professional advice and clinical research to trending news topics and breaking stories, some publications have included Psychology Today, Teen Vogue, Yahoo Lifestyle, Life & Style, Us Weekly, and Bustle Magazine. She also contributes clinical research manuscripts to national and international psychological journals, and has written chapter contributions for mental health textbooks.

Television and radio

Face The Truth
Season 1 of the CBS syndicated daytime talk show Face The Truth, produced by Jay McGraw and Stage 29 Productions, premiered nationwide on September 10, 2018, hosted by Dr. Judy, Vivica A. Fox, Rosie Mercado, Areva Martin, and Judge "Scary Mary" (Mary Chrzanowski).

SuperCharged Life with Dr. Judy
Season 1 of the Supercharged Life with Dr. Judy podcast, produced by Stage 29 Podcast Productions, premiered nationwide on March 24, 2021, hosted by Ho.

Other
Having a long-standing professional friendship with Dr. Drew Pinsky, Ho joins him on-air to co-host Dr. Drew Midday Live on KABC 790 radio, which broadcasts in Los Angeles and San Francisco. On the same station, she offers a psychological POV, advice and analysis as a guest expert on the McIntyre In The Morning.

Filmography
Ho's television credits include the following (with detailed listing on IMDb:

Television
 Netflix - Crime Scene: Vanishing at the Cecil Hotel (2021)
 Access Hollywood (2019-2021: recurring expert)
 Inside Edition (2019-2020: recurring expert)
 Daily Mail TV (2019-2020: recurring expert)
 The Doctors (2019-2020: season co-host)
 Dr. Phil (2020: clinical psychologist expert)
 Oxygen TV Movie - Golden State Killer: Main Suspect (2018)
 Lifetime TV Movie - JonBenet's Mother: Victim or Killer (2016)
 Dr. Drew On Call (2013-2016: 203 episodes)
 Face The Truth (2018-2019: 115 episodes)
 The Doctors (2017-2018: 82 episodes)
 Motive to Murder (2016-2017: 23 episodes)
 It Takes A Killer (2016-2017: 18 episodes)
 Fox 11 News (2015-2018: 17 episodes)
 CNN Newsroom (2013-2018: 14 episodes)
 Crime Watch Daily (2016-2018: 14 episodes)
 MichaeLA (2016-2018: 14 episodes)
 CNN Newsroom (2013-2018: 14 episodes)
 Deep Undercover (2016-2017: 10 episodes)
 On The Story with Erica Hill (2016-2018: 7 episodes)
 The Daily Share (2015-2016: 7 episodes)
 Jane Velez-Mitchell (2014: 7 episodes)
 Nancy Grace (2013-2015: 6 episodes)
 Pretty Bad Girls (2012-2013: 6 episodes)
 Deadly Sins (2016-2017: 5 episodes)
 TakePart Live (2014: 5 episodes)
 Crime & Justice (2017-2018: 5 episodes)
 Evil Genius (2017: 4 episodes)
 Inside Edition (2017-2018: 3 episodes)
Across America with Carol Costello (2017-2018: 3 episodes)
 Murderous Affairs (2017: 3 episodes)
 CNN Tonight (2015-2018: 3 episodes)
 Murder Among Friends (2016-2017: 3 episodes)
 Blood Relatives (2015-2016: 3 episodes)
 KCAL 9 News (2015-2016: 3 episodes)
 True Nightmares (2016: 3 episodes)
 Snapped: Killer Couples (2015-2016: 3 episodes)
 Hollywood Scandals (2013-2014: 3 episodes)
 Mind Field (2017-2019: 2 episodes)
 CBS 2 News (2015-2016: 2 episodes)
Momsters: When Moms Go Bad (2015: 2 episodes)
 The Daily Helpline (2014: 2 episodes)
 Wicked Attraction (2013: 2 episodes)
 Morning Express (2019: 1 episode)
 Ancient Aliens (2018: 1 episode)
 Early Start (2017: 1 episode)
 I Knew My Murderer (2017: 1 episode)
 You Can Do Better (2017: 1 episode)
 Good Morning Britain (2016: 1 episode)
 Outside the Lines (2016: 1 episode)
 Death By Gossip with Wendy Williams (2015: 1 episode)
 Killer Kids (2015: 1 episode)
 Marriage Boot Camp (2015: 1 episode)
 The Insider (2015: 1 episode)
 ABC 7 Eyewitness News (2014: 1 episode)
 Piers Morgan Live (2013: 1 episode)
 Braxton Family Values (2012: 1 episode)

References

Living people
American women psychologists
21st-century American psychologists
Popular psychology
Television personalities from California
American women television personalities
21st-century American non-fiction writers
University of California, Los Angeles alumni
University of California, San Diego alumni
University of California, Berkeley alumni
Taiwanese emigrants to the United States
People from Arcadia, California
Scientists from Taipei
American women non-fiction writers
Year of birth missing (living people)
21st-century American women writers